Colin Clive (born Colin Glenn Clive-Greig; 20 January 1900 – 25 June 1937) was a British stage and screen actor. His most memorable role was Henry Frankenstein, the creator of the monster, in the 1931 film Frankenstein and its 1935 sequel, Bride of Frankenstein.

Early life
Clive was born in Saint-Malo, France, to an English colonel, Colin Philip Greig, and his wife, Caroline Margaret Lugard Clive. He attended Stonyhurst College and subsequently Royal Military Academy Sandhurst, where an injured knee disqualified him from military service and contributed to his becoming a stage actor. He was a member of the Hull Repertory Theatre Company for three years.

Clive created the role of Steve Baker, the white husband of racially mixed Julie LaVerne, in the first London production of Show Boat; the production featured Cedric Hardwicke and Paul Robeson. Clive first worked with James Whale in the Savoy Theatre production of Journey's End and subsequently joined the British community in Hollywood, repeating his stage role in the film version.

Hollywood
Clive's first screen role, in Journey's End (1930), was also directed by James Whale. Clive played the tormented alcoholic Captain Stanhope, a character that (much like Clive's other roles) mirrored his personal life.
He was an in-demand leading man for several major film actresses of the era, including Katharine Hepburn, Bette Davis, Corinne Griffith, and Jean Arthur. He starred as Edward Rochester in the 1934 adaptation of Jane Eyre opposite Virginia Bruce. He was a descendant of Robert Clive and appeared in a featured role in Clive of India (1935), a biopic of his ancestor.

Colin Clive, together with Leo G. Carroll, starred in a radio play titled The Other Place. It was written by John L. Balderston for the radio program The Fleischmann's Yeast Hour hosted by Rudy Vallee. It was aired on 14 November 1935.

Personal life
Clive was married to Jeanne de Casalis in June 1929, though they were estranged for several years before his death.

Death
Colin Clive suffered from severe chronic alcoholism and died from complications of tuberculosis in 1937 at age 37.

Clive's alcoholism was apparent to his co-stars, as he was often seen napping on set and sometimes was so intoxicated that he had to be held upright for over-the-shoulder shots. Clive was tormented by the medical threat of amputation of his long-damaged leg.

Forrest J Ackerman recalled visiting Clive's body: "I actually saw him in death, lying in a bed at a mortuary where it was possible for the public to view his body. He looked remarkably as he had when lying in bed in The Bride of Frankenstein." Over 300 mourners turned out. One of the pallbearers was Peter Lorre. His cenotaph is located at Chapel of the Pines Crematory.

Roles

Stage
Peter and Paul (September 1925)
Advertising April (November 1925)

Film
Journey's End (1930) as Capt. Denis Stanhope (film debut)
Frankenstein (1931) as Henry Frankenstein
The Stronger Sex (1931) as Warren Barrington
Lily Christine (1932) as Rupert Harvey
Christopher Strong (1933) as Sir Christopher Strong
Looking Forward (1933) as Geoffrey Fielding
The Key (1934) as Capt. Andrew 'Andy' Kerr
One More River (1934) as Sir Gerald Corven
Jane Eyre (1934) as Edward Rochester
Clive of India (1935) as Capt. Johnstone
The Right to Live (1935) as Maurice
Bride of Frankenstein (1935) as Henry Frankenstein
The Girl from 10th Avenue (1935) as John Marland
Mad Love (1935) as Stephen Orlac
The Man Who Broke the Bank at Monte Carlo (1935) as Bertrand Berkeley
The Widow from Monte Carlo (1935) as Lord Eric Reynolds
History Is Made at Night (1937) as Bruce Vail
The Woman I Love (1937) as Capt. Thelis (final film)

Notes

References

External links

1900 births
1937 deaths
People from Saint-Malo
English male film actors
English male stage actors
20th-century deaths from tuberculosis
Burials at Chapel of the Pines Crematory
People educated at Stonyhurst College
20th-century English male actors
British expatriate male actors in the United States
British expatriates in France
Tuberculosis deaths in California
Alcohol-related deaths in California